Zarrina Mirshakar (born 19 March 1947) is a Tajik composer. She was born in Dushanbe, Tajikistan, into the family of the national poet Mirsaid Mirshakar. She studied at Dushanbe Music College under Yuri Ter-Osipov from 1963–67 and at the Moscow Conservatory with Sergey Balasanian from 1967–74.

After completing her studies, Mirshakar took a position in 1974 at the Mirzo Tursun-zade Institute of Art in Tajikistan, and in 1994 became a senior lecturer in orchestration and composition.

Works
Selected works include:
2 pamirskiye kartinï (2 Pamir Pictures) for orchestra, 1973–4
Sinfonietta for strings, 1973–5
Kraski solnechnogo Pamira (The Colours of the Sunny Pamir), symphonic poem, 1982
Symphony no.1 for strings, 1991–3
Cantata (M. Mirshakar) for children's chorus, chamber orch, 1975
String Quartet, 1973
3 pamirskiye freski (3 Pamir Frescoes) for violin, pianoforte, 1976–7
Sonata-poėma for clarinet, 1981
24 muzïkal'nïkh bayta (24 Musical Bytes) for pianoforte, 1982
Sonata for oboe, 1987
Crescendo for violin, pianoforte, 1988
Respiro for violin, chamber orchestra, timpany, 1990
Romance for three flutes, 1992
3 p'yesï (3 Pieces) for three violins, 1995
6 p'yes (6 Pieces) for flute, clarinet, 1995
Nash Boki (Our Boki), film score (dir. V. Akhadov), 1972
BAM, film score (The Baykal-Amur Railway), 1988

References

1947 births
Living people
20th-century classical composers
Music educators
Women classical composers
Tajikistani composers
People from Dushanbe
Women music educators
20th-century women composers